Roel Konijnendijk is a Dutch historian known for his research on Classical Greek warfare and military thought. He is best known as the author of Classical Greek Tactics.

Early life and education
In 2004, Konijnendijk enrolled at Leiden University where he received a BA and MPhil in history. He graduated from University College London with a PhD in 2015.

Career

Academic history
Konijnendijk was a postdoctoral fellow at the Institute of Historical Research and Leiden. He has taught Greek History at Birkbeck, University of Warwick, University of Edinburgh and New College, Oxford. He has contributed to a number of books on the topics of Classical Greek warfare, the military reforms of Iphicrates, Athenian democracy, and the military history of Sparta. He is also cited as an expert on the training and organization of Classical Greek and Persian armies.

He is a proponent of the theory that Greek warfare was both more brutal than some modern scholars have described, and that it was driven by practicality rather than ritual. His research challenges the so-called "California School" of Greek military scholarship, arguing that its theories were largely based on outdated 19th-century models.

In 2017, Konijnendijk published Classical Greek Tactics: A Cultural History. The book was well received, with praise for Konijnendijk's re-assessment of Greek tactics. With Cezary Kucewicz and Matthew Lloyd he edited Companion to Greek Land Warfare Beyond the Phalanx (2021), and also wrote three chapters of it.

He published his second monograph, Between Miltiades and Moltke: Early German Studies in Greek Military History, in 2022.

Popular history

Konijnendijk is a moderator and panelist for AskHistorians, an online history platform. He has also written for a number of popular history magazines, including Ancient Warfare, Ancient History Magazine, Ancient World Magazine, BadAncient, and Desperta Ferro.

In 2021 and 2022, he appeared in a series of videos for Insider, where he discussed the historical accuracy of well-known fantasy and historical drama films such as 300 and The Lord of the Rings: The Two Towers.

Selected Bibliography 

 Between Miltiades and Moltke: Early German Studies in Greek Military History. Brill Publishers. 2022.
 "The Face of Battle at Plataiai", in The Battle of Plataia 479 BC. Phoibos. 2022.
 "The eager amateur: unit cohesion and the Athenian hoplite phalanx", in Unit Cohesion in the Ancient World. Routledge. 2022.
 (ed. and contributor with C. Kucewicz and M. Lloyd). A Companion to Greek Land Warfare Beyond the Phalanx. Brill Publishers. 2021.
 "Legitimization of war" in A Companion to the Achaemenid Persian Empire. Wiley-Blackwell. 2021.
 "Democracy as protection against intra-communal violence in Classical Greece", in Violence and Democracy. British Academy, 2019.
 "Commemoration through fear: the Spartan reputation as a weapon of war", in Commemorating War and War Dead: Ancient and Modern. Steiner Verlag, 2019.
 Classical Greek Tactics: A Cultural History. Brill Publishers. 2018.
 "Iphikrates the innovator and the historiography of Lechaion", in Iphicrates, Peltasts and Lechaeum. Akanthina, 2014.

References 

Scholars of ancient Greek history
Leiden University alumni
Alumni of University College London
People associated with the University of Edinburgh School of History, Classics and Archaeology
Academics of the University of Warwick
Living people
21st-century Dutch writers
Year of birth missing (living people)